Ronnie Eldridge (née Myers) is an American activist, businesswoman, politician, and television host. She is the current host of Eldridge & Co., a weekly television talk show on CUNY TV, the television station of the City University of New York.

Life and career 
In 1977, Eldridge resigned from a position as an executive producer at Channel 13, where she worked on such television series as Woman Alive!, to enter politics and run for president of the borough of Manhattan, asking, "Does anyone honestly believe that the whole household of Manhattan can be run by men alone?." A protégé of Robert F. Kennedy, she went on to serve New York City's Mayor John V. Lindsay as Special Assistant, and was the only female member of the cabinet of New York Governor Mario Cuomo serving as Director of the Division for Women. Equal parts entrepreneurial and political she spearheaded Special Projects for MS Magazine and served as Executive Director of the MS Foundation for Women. From 1989 to 2001, she represented the Upper West Side on New York's City Council. Since then she has worked on various political projects as well as several business ventures and activism campaigns focusing on women's rights. She was married to Jimmy Breslin, a Pulitzer Prize-winning journalist and author. The celebrated marriage between the feminist politician and the gruff city columnist inspired the CBS show, "American Nuclear." She and her husband are the parents of nine children and 11 grandchildren. They remained married until Breslin's death in 2017 left Eldridge widowed for a second time.

In 2019, Eldridge endorsed Pete Buttigieg in the 2020 Democratic Party presidential primaries.

References

Living people
New York City Council members
Barnard College alumni
Year of birth missing (living people)